Take a Picture is a 1968 album by singer-songwriter Margo Guryan. It is her sole album release.

History

Previously primarily a songwriter, Margo Guryan signed to Bell Records as an artist, recording an album, Take a Picture (1968), full of light, jazz-tinged pop melodies, produced and arranged initially by John Simon, then when he became unavailable, by John Hill, both overseen by David Rosner. The musicians on the record included Hill on guitar, Kirk Hamilton (flute, bass), Phil Bodner (oboe), Paul Griffin (keyboards) and Buddy Saltzman (drums).

John Simon produced and arranged "Don't Go Away" prior to leaving to produce Janis Joplin. Simon had worked on an arrangement of "Think of Rain" for The Cyrkle that was not used, which incorporated aspects of Bach's "Air on the G String". This inspired the writing of "Someone I Know", which incorporates "Jesu, Joy of Man's Desiring".

The album was preceded by a single entitled "Spanky and Our Gang", a tribute to the band who had had a hit with "Sunday Morning", backed with her own version of "Sunday Morning". The single was included on the Japanese reissue of Take a Picture.

Take a Picture was praised by Billboard, who remarked on Guryan's "fine sound" which it characterised as "commercial" and said "should insure strong sales". However Guryan refused to tour, having been married to a jazz musician and having seen "too much – performing required an agent, and a manager and a lawyer and a booking person and... you got owned by these people – they told you where to go, how to look, how to dress, what to say, and I didn't want that! [...] I guess I had about enough 'daddy' when I was five, and I just didn't like being told what to do." As a consequence of this, the label ceased promoting the album and it thus failed to make an impact. Resigned to this, Guryan withdrew from performing, although she continued as writer for April-Blackwood for several years afterwards, and worked with Rosner producing records for other artists.

Track listing
All tracks composed by Margo Guryan
 "Sunday Morning" – 2:20
 "Sun" – 2:36
 "Love Songs" – 2:37
 "Thoughts" – 2:25
 "Don't Go Away" – 2:04
 "Take a Picture" – 3:08
 "What Can I Give You?" – 2:31
 "Think of Rain" – 2:25
 "Can You Tell" – 2:34
 "Someone I Know" – 2:46
 "Love" – 5:26

Personnel
Kirk Hamilton – bass, flute
Buddy Saltzman – drums
John Hill – guitar
Paul Griffin – keyboards
Phil Bodner – oboe

Technical
Fred Catero, Glen Kolotkin, Lou Waxman, Roy Segal – engineer

References

1968 debut albums
Albums produced by John Simon (record producer)
Bell Records albums
Albums with cover art by Joel Brodsky